Ayushita Widyartoeti Nugraha, better known as Ayushita, (born June 9, 1989) is an Indonesian singer, actress and dancer of Indonesian Javanese descent.

Career
Nugraha started her film career in 2005 and she starred in the film Me vs. High Heels. She joined the musical band group BBB, fronted Melly Goeslaw, in 2007. She is currently focusing on acting in television soap operas and advertisements.

Music career

Compilation album
 Ost. Ketika Cinta Bertasbih (2009)

Soundtrack album
 Ost. Bukan Bintang Biasa (2006)

Singles

Filmography

Film

Television

Film Television

TV commercials
 3
 Gramedia
 Indomie
 Supermi
 Bank Niaga Syariah
 Betadine
 Bank BII
 Ardiles
 Pioneer

Awards and nominations

References

External links
 
 
 

1989 births
Living people
Indonesian pop singers
Indonesian rhythm and blues singers
21st-century Indonesian women singers
Indonesian dance musicians
Synth-pop singers
Indonesian female dancers
Actresses from Jakarta
Singers from Jakarta
Indonesian film actresses
Indonesian television actresses